The Greatest Hits is the second European compilation album by American singer-actress Cher, released on November 30, 1999, by Warner Music U.K.'s WEA label. The album was very successful worldwide, topping the charts in Austria, Germany, and Denmark. It peaked at #7 on the official UK Albums Chart, and reached the top 10 in several countries across Europe and the rest of the world. This compilation was not available in the United States, due to the release of the US-only compilation, If I Could Turn Back Time: Cher's Greatest Hits which was released that same year. The album sold 3 million copies as of January 2000.

Track listing

Notes
"Believe" features writing contribution by Cher who remains uncredited.

Personnel
Cher – main vocals, production
Sonny Bono – main vocals, production
Mark Taylor – production
Peter Asher – production
Brian Rawling – production
Michael Lavine – photography

Charts

Weekly charts

Year-end charts

Certifications and sales

References

External links
Official Cher site
Warner official site

1999 greatest hits albums
Albums produced by Peter Asher
Cher compilation albums
Warner Records compilation albums
Albums produced by Brian Rawling